HMAS Supply (A195), named after the Royal Navy ship , is the lead ship of the s built for the Royal Australian Navy by Navantia at their yard in Ferrol, Spain. The Australian Supply-class ships are based on the Spanish Navy's replenishment oiler . The vessel was launched on 18 November 2017 and commissioned on 10 April 2021.

Design and construction

The Supply-class ships are intended to carry fuel, dry cargo, water, food, ammunition, equipment and spare parts to provide operational support for deployed Australian naval or combat forces operating away from the nation for long periods. In addition to replenishment, the vessels can be used to combat against environmental pollution at sea, provide logistics support for the armed forces, and to support humanitarian and disaster relief (HADR) operations following a natural disaster. The contract to build the two auxiliary oiler replenishment ships was awarded to Navantia in 2016.

Supply was laid down on 18 November 2017 and launched at the Navantia Shipyards in Ferrol, Spain on 24 November 2018. Supply is the second Royal Australian Navy (RAN) ship to bear the name after . On 2 October 2020, Supply arrived at Fleet Base West, Western Australia for final fit out and testing activities. Ship acceptance by the Department of Defence occurred on 8 January 2021.

Operational history
Supply replaced  which was decommissioned in June 2019. The ship arrived in Australia in early October 2020. While the ship's operational home port is Fleet Base East, its ceremonial home port is the Port of Eden.

The ship was commissioned on 10 April 2021 at Fleet Base East, Sydney. The commissioning ceremony quickly became the object of national controversy because of the RAN's decision to invite a local group of scantily-clad dancers to perform a routine that included twerking. An anonymous federal government frontbencher commented: "A question worth pondering: what would Horatio Nelson think of this shitshow?".

Supply was tasked with supporting the Australian Government effort lead by the Department of Foreign Affairs and Trade to the Kingdom of Tonga in February 2022 alongside HMA Ships Adelaide and Canberra provide Australian Aid supplies and water to the country affected by the Hunga Tonga-Hunga Ha'apai eruption and tsunami

Supply participated in RIMPAC 2022.

References

Supply-class replenishment oilers
2018 ships
Ships built in Spain